Roger Dormoy (1914–1984) was an Egyptian-born French cinematographer.

Selected filmography
 Colonel Durand (1948)
 Fandango (1949)
 Thus Finishes the Night (1949)
 I Like Only You (1949)
 Mademoiselle Josette, My Woman (1950)
 Jocelyn (1952)
 My Brother from Senegal (1953)
 The Secret of Helene Marimon (1954)
 Short Head (1956)
 It's All Adam's Fault (1958)
 The Gigolo (1960)
 Jacquou le Croquant (1969, TV series)

References

Bibliography 
 Waldman, Harry. Maurice Tourneur: The Life and Films. McFarland, 2001.

External links 
 

1914 births
1984 deaths
French cinematographers
People from Ismailia
Egyptian emigrants to France